Roman Forum of Tarragona may refer to:

Colonial forum of Tarraco
Provincial forum of Tarraco